Linepithema anathema is a species of ant in the genus Linepithema. Described by Wild in 2007, the species is endemic to Brazil.

References

Dolichoderinae
Hymenoptera of South America
Insects described in 2007